The final of the Miss Perú 2015 pageant was held on the night June 2, 2015 at the Belmond Miraflores Park Hotel. It was the first year under the new Miss Peru Organization, marking the comeback of Jessica Newton as national director. The first cut to a Top 20 was chosen on May 2, in a press conference. Later on May 14, the second cut to a Top 10 and Special Awards was chosen during a live broadcast by América Televisión and later to a Top 5. On a private ceremony, an eventual Top 3 was decided to participate for the national crown. 

The outgoing titleholder, Jimena Espinoza of Region Lima crowned her successor, Laura Spoya of Lima at the end of the event. 

Spoya represented Peru at Miss Universe 2015. 

The rest of the finalists would enter in different pageants including first runner-up, Lorena Larriviere who competed at Miss Supranational 2018.

The final round of the pageant was not televised, but a recap was shown the following day by Andina de Television.

Placements

Special Awards

 Best Regional Costume - Ayacucho - Stefani Jurado Sotelo
 Miss Photogenic - Australia Peru - Marsi Fernández-Maldonado
 Miss Elegance - Jesús María - Lorena Larriviere
 Miss Body - Pasco - Jessamin Chaparro
 Best Hair - Surco - Paola Rosenberg
 Miss Congeniality - Ucayali - Kayla Abenzur
 Most Beautiful Face - Australia Peru - Marsi Fernández-Maldonado
 Best Smile - Region Lima - Yanina Allison
 Miss Internet - Distrito Capital - Laura Spoya (by votes of Missologo Peru Forum)

.

Delegates

Amazonas -  Hanny Portocarrero
Áncash - Almendra Pacheco
Apurímac - Diana Ibáñez
Arequipa - Lisdey Paredes
Australia Peru - Marsi Fernández-Maldonado
Ayacucho - Stefani Jurado Sotelo
Cajamarca - Leticia Rivera
Callao - Claudia Manrique
Caraz - Alessandra Morey
Chiclayo - Paula Andrea Fernández
Chincha - Denisse Martínez 
Chota - Maricielo Mendoza
Cuzco - María del Carmen García
Distrito Capital - Laura Spoya
Huancavelica - Mariel Zuñiga 
Huánuco - Geraldine Aguirre 
Huaral - Brenda Pavia
Ica - Luz Mieses Cartagena
Independencia - Melany Arevalo
Ilabaya -  Zully Salazar
Ite - Allison Arnao
Jesús María - Lorena Larriviere

Junín - Ornella Pesceros
La Libertad - Estefani Goicochea
La Punta - Isamar Salazar
Lambayeque - Almendra Quiroz 
Loreto - Olenka Arimuya 
Madre de Dios - Briggitte Gallardo
Moquegua - Maria Jose Cruz
Nazca - Diana Aranguren 
Oxapampa - Adriana del Campo
Pasco - Jessamin Chaparro
Pisco - Alysson Andía
Piura - Leonela Alzamora
Punta Hermosa - Mariana Zumaran
Region Lima - Yanina Allison
San Martín - Sally Vásquez
Surco - Paola Rosenberg
Tacna - Samanda Caichihua 
Tumán - Joselyn Camacho Agip
Tumbes - Mayté Fernández
Ucayali - Kayla Abenzur
Urubamba - Grecia Chávez

.

Judges 

Wendy Monteverde - Miss World Peru 1999

Claudia Jiménez - Fashion Designer

Karím Chaman - Interior decorator & Owner of Karím Chaman Boutique

Dr. Ricardo Cruzálegui - Plastic Surgeon

Luis Miguel Ciccia - Manager of Transportes CIVA

Carmen Maria Correa - Founder of Kon-Dor bags and accessories

Ludwing Lobatón - Choreographer & Official Coach of Miss Peru org.

Dr. Paola Ochoa - Director of Dental Esthetics of Infinity Dental Clinic

Wendy Wunder - Fashion Designer

Mariana Larrabure - Miss World Peru 1998

Viviana Rivas Plata - Miss Peru 2001

Mónica Ferreira - Runway Coach

Mónica Chacón - Miss World Peru 1996

Ana Maria Guiulfo - Fashion Designer

Marina Mora - Miss World Peru 2001

Carlos Andrés Luna -  Head of Public relations and Partner of Lima Fashion Week

Renzo Costa - Leather Designer

Fernando Gomberoff - Manager of Beauty Form

Norka Peralta del Águila - Peruvian Designer

 Jack Abugattas - Fashion Designer

Adriana Zubiate - Miss Peru 2002

.

References

External links
Official Site

Miss Peru
2015 in Peru
Peru